Subjudge or sub-judge  may refer to:

 Subordinate judge, a judge of a subordinate court in the Indian court system
 Podsędek (literally: sub-judge), a historical judicial official in Poland

See also
 Sub judice, means that a particular case or matter is under trial or being considered by a judge or court.